Summer of '42 is an album by Tony Bennett, released in 1972. The album reached a peak position of number 182 on the Billboard 200. It was arranged by Torrie Zito, Robert Farnon, Marion Evans and Frank De Vol.

Billboard reviewed Summer of '42 upon its release and wrote that "Bennett comes up with a winner in this package of exceptional performances of some of today's best material".

Track listing
 "Theme from Summer of '42 (The Summer Knows)" (Michel Legrand, Alan and Marilyn Bergman) - 3:34
 "Walkabout" (John Barry, Don Black) - 2:38
 "It Was Me" (Gilbert Bécaud, Norman Gimbel) - 3:04
 "Losing My Mind" (Stephen Sondheim) - 2:50
 "Till" (Charles Danvers, Carl Sigman) - 2:58
 "Somewhere Along the Line" (Dinah Washington, Walter Merrick) - 3:00
 "Coffee Break" (James Moody) - 2:10
 "More and More" (Sacha Distel, R. I. Allen) - 3:04
 "Irena" (Robert Farnon)- 2:44
 "My Inamorata" - (John Williams, Johnny Mercer) 3:39
 "The Shining Sea" (Johnny Mandel, Peggy Lee) - 2:48

Personnel
Tony Bennett - vocals
Robert Farnon, Marion Evans, Robert Farnon, Frank De Vol, Torrie Zito - arranger

References

1972 albums
Tony Bennett albums
Albums arranged by Torrie Zito
Albums arranged by Robert Farnon
Albums arranged by Frank De Vol
Columbia Records albums